The Regions of Ghana constitute the first level of subnational government administration within the Republic of Ghana. As of 2020, there are currently sixteen regions, which are further divided for administrative purposes into 260 local metropolitan, municipal and district assemblies (or MMDA's).

Current regions
The former ten regional boundaries were officially established in 1987, when the Upper West Region was inaugurated as the state's newest administrative region. Although the official inauguration was in 1987, the Upper West Region had already functioned as an administrative unit since the break-up of the Upper Region in December 1982, prior to the 1984 national census. The referendum on the creation of six new regions was held on 27 December 2018 – all proposed new regions were approved.

Previous regional configurations

Independence - 6 March 1957
At Independence in March 1957, the Northern Territories, Trans-Volta Togoland and the Gold Coast came together to form Ghana. There were initially five regions. The Trans-Volta Togoland was combined with part of the Eastern Region and Northern Territories to form the Volta Region.

Post-independence and First republic
On 4 April 1959, the Ashanti Region was officially split into the Ashanti and Brong-Ahafo Regions. This followed the Brong Ahafo Region Act No. 18 of 1959. This was in line with what the Brong Kyempem movement had been campaigning for, which is the recognition of the Bono people as a separate ethnic group from the Ashantis with their own region.

On the day Ghana became a republic, 1 July 1960, the Northern Region got split into the Northern and Upper regions raising the number of regions to seven.

Second Republic
During the second republic, the Western Region was split into the Western and Central Regions, making eight regions in total. This was done ahead of the 1970 population census. In 1971, Sekondi and Takoradi were merged to form Sekondi-Takoradi, the new capital of the Western Region.

PNDC era
The Provisional National Defence Council which was the military government in power between 31 December 1981 and January 1993 promulgated the Greater Accra Law (PNDCL 26) of 23 July 1982 which created the Greater Accra Region. This made the Accra Capital District, where the national capital, Accra was and the Ada Local Council, both areas within the Eastern Region parts of the new Greater Accra Region. In the following year 1983, the Upper Region was divided into the Upper East Region and Upper West Regions, bringing the total number of regions to ten.

See also 
List of Ghanaian regional ministers
List of Ghanaian regions by area
List of Ghanaian regions by Human Development Index
List of Ghanaian regions by population
ISO 3166-2:GH

General:
 Administrative divisions of Ghana

References 

 
Subdivisions of Ghana
Ghana 1
Regions, Ghana
Ghana
Ghana, Regions
Ghana geography-related lists